South Andhra Lutheran Church is a Christian denomination in India. It is Telugu-speaking.
It is led by Bishop Rev.E.Vijayabhasker, who elected by an election It has tens of thousands of members. It belongs to the Lutheran World Federation.
Several church lands which were given to the leaders by missionaries are being sold after decades. The other churches belonging to the United Evangelical Lutheran Church in India are:
Andhra Evangelical Lutheran Church
Arcot Lutheran Church
Evangelical Lutheran Church in Madhya Pradesh
Evangelical Lutheran Church in the Himalayan States
Good Samaritan Evangelical Lutheran Church
Gossner Evangelical Lutheran Church in Chotanagpur and Assam
Indian Evangelical Lutheran Church
Jeypore Evangelical Lutheran Church
Northern Evangelical Lutheran Church
Tamil Evangelical Lutheran Church

See also
Christianity in Andhra Pradesh
 Lutheran Churches in Andhra Pradesh
 Sheastley Memorial Girls High School

References

External links
Website of the United Evangelical Lutheran Church in India

Christianity in Andhra Pradesh
Lutheranism in India
Lutheran World Federation members
Affiliated institutions of the National Council of Churches in India